Zivojin Stjepić was the Deputy Minister of Religion in the Government of Serbia (2001-2004). He was in large part responsible for the reinstitution of religious education as a school subject in Serbian schools after it had been ignored for 60 years by the communist regime.  He was a vice-president of the Christian Democratic Party of Serbia which is a right of centre, pro Monarchist Serbian political party.

External links
Christian Democratic Party of Serbia Official web site

Year of birth missing (living people)
Living people
Politicians of Eastern Orthodox political parties
Serbia and Montenegro politicians
Christian Democratic Party of Serbia politicians